-zilla is an English slang suffix, a libfix back-formation derived from the English name of the Japanese movie monster Godzilla. It is popular for the names of software and websites. It is also found often in popular culture to imply some form of excess, denoting the monster-like qualities of Godzilla.

This trend has been observed since the popularization of the Mozilla Project, which itself included the Internet Relay Chat client ChatZilla.

The use of the suffix was contested by Toho, owners of the trademark Godzilla, in a lawsuit against the website Davezilla and also against Sears for their mark Bagzilla. Toho has since trademarked the word "Zilla" and retroactively used it as an official name for the "Godzilla In Name Only" creature from the 1998 Roland Emmerich film.

List of items ending in -zilla
Some uses of the suffix -zilla include:

Businesses and products 
 AmiZilla, an Amiga port of Mozilla Firefox
 Chipzilla, a humorous epithet for the Intel Corporation
 Clonezilla, an open source disk cloning software
 FileZilla, an FTP program
 Go!Zilla, a download manager program
 Hubzilla, an open source social network, part of Fediverse
 Mozilla, a group of Internet-related programs created by the Mozilla Foundation, also name of the group's widely known web browser
 Bugzilla, open source bug tracking software, with a web-based interface.
 ChatZilla, an Internet Relay Chat program
 Mozilla Application Suite
 Classilla, a rebranded Mozilla Application Suite, an internet suite for the classic Mac OS
 Ghostzilla, a web browser
 GNUzilla, GNU's fork of the Mozilla Application Suite
 Warpzilla, the Mozilla Application suite for OS/2
 Newszilla, the Usenet server of the Dutch internet provider XS4ALL
 Podzilla, an open source user interface for the IPodLinux project, which allows for alternative functionality of Apple Computer's iPod
 Quizilla, an online personality quiz website, which contains its own "Zillapedia"
 RevZilla.com, an online motorcycle gear retailer
 Shopzilla, a comparison-shopping search engine, formerly BizRate.com
Godzilla (Nissan GT-R), a grand touring/ sports vehicle produced by Nissan

Entertainment 
 Bongzilla, a rock band from Madison, Wisconsin
 "Bootzilla", a song recorded by Bootsy's Rubber Band
 Bridezilla (band), an Australian indie rock band
 Bridezilla (EP), a recording by the band Bridezilla
 Bridezillas, a reality show which airs on the WE: Women's Entertainment network
 Broadzilla, a rock band from Detroit, Michigan
 Davezilla, a humor website
 Godzilla, the  franchise from which the -zilla suffix originates
 Godzilla (1954 film), the first film in the franchise
 Zilla, a fictional character originally known as Godzilla, from the 1998 American Godzilla film
 Illzilla, an Australian hip hop group featuring live instruments
 Popzilla, an animated TV series in production for MTV
 Rapzilla, a Christian hip hop online magazine
 Tekzilla, a weekly video podcast on the Revision3 network

Miscellaneous 
 axizilla, a heavy form of axion in an extension of the Standard Model.
 bitchzilla, a severely disagreeable or aggressive woman.
 couplezilla, a couple who, in the course of planning their wedding, display difficult, selfish, narcissistic behavior relating to the event.
 cuntzilla, a term of abuse for a severely disagreeable or aggressive woman.
 Fedzilla, the federal government regarded as a rapacious monster with an appetite for political power, money, etc.
 groomzilla, a demanding and perfectionist groom (man who is to be married).
 Hogzilla, a large male wild hog hybrid that was stabbed and killed in 2004 in Georgia, United States.
 momzilla, a controlling or over-involved mother.
 Pigzilla, another large feral pig or possible hoax shot in 2007 in Alabama, United States.
 Upazila, administrative division for districts in Bangladesh.
 Calabazilla, a plant known as it by its name Cucurbita foetidissima.
 promzilla, a teenage girl who is obsessed with preparing for her prom and ensuring it turns out the way she envisions.
 Snowzilla (disambiguation)
 weddingzilla, a person overly concerned with ensuring that a wedding goes exactly as they envision it.
 wimpzilla, a theoretical superheavy dark matter particle, trillions of times more massive than other proposed types of dark matter.

For derived words 
 Words ending with -zilla  (List of examples in English Wiktionary)
 -zilla (explaining the suffix in English Wiktionary)

References

English suffixes
Computing terminology
Godzilla (franchise)
Internet slang
Slang
Neologisms